The 1957 Campeonato Paulista da Primeira Divisão, organized by the Federação Paulista de Futebol, was the 56th season of São Paulo's top professional football league. São Paulo won the title for the 8th time. Linense was relegated and the top scorer was Santos's Pelé with 36 goals (17 in the Blue Series).

Championship
The championship was disputed in three phases:

 Qualifying round: all twenty teams played each other in a single-round robin system, with the ten best teams advancing to the Blue Series and the ten worst going on to dispute the White Series.
 Blue Series: The ten teams played each other in a double round-robin system, and the team with the most points won the title.
 White Series: The ten teams played each other in a double round-robin system, and the team with the fewest points was relegated.

Qualifying phase

Playoffs

Top Scorers

Blue Series

Top Scorers

White Series

Final standings

References

Campeonato Paulista seasons
Paulista